The 2017–18 season was Ararat-Moskva's 1st season in existence, in which they finished Third in the First League, gaining promotion to the Armenian Premier League, whilst they were knocked out of the Armenian Cup by Gandzasar Kapan in the Quarter-finals.

Season events
The club began the season under the name of Avan Academy, and featured predominately players from the Yerevan Football Academy and graduates from Pyunik, and managed by Artak Oseyan. At the beginning of 2018, the club was taken over by the Russian-Armenian businessman Samvel Karapetyan who renamed the football club as Ararat-Moskva. The club was reorganized as soon as FC Ararat Moscow in Russia was denied certificate for the next season.

Squad

Transfers

In

Loans in

Out

Released

Competitions

Overall record

First League

Results summary

Results

Table

Armenian Cup

Statistics

Appearances and goals

|-
|colspan="16"|Players away on loan:
|-
|colspan="16"|Players who left Ararat-Moskva during the season:

|}

Goal scorers

Clean sheets

Disciplinary Record

References

FC Ararat-Armenia seasons
Ararat-Moskva